Naruko may refer to:

People with the given name
Hanaharu Naruko (鳴子 ハナハル), Japanese manga artist, who often works in adult hentai manga
, Japanese lady-in-waiting of the Imperial House of Japan.

Places
 Naruko Dam, is a concrete gravity-arch dam
 Naruko-Gotenyu Station, is a railway station on the Rikuu East Line
 Naruko Kita Station, is an underground metro station located in Tempaku-ku
 Naruko, Miyagi, a former town in Japan, now merged into Ōsaki, Miyagi
 Naruko-Onsen Station, is a railway station on the Rikuu East Line
 Naruko (volcano), a volcano located near the former town of Naruko in Japan

Other uses
 Naruko, wooden clappers held by Yosakoi dancers in Japan

Japanese feminine given names
Japanese-language surnames